Cow Cave is a limestone cave system which is situated on the south side of the Chudleigh Rocks, close to the town of Chudleigh, Devon, England. It is listed as a Scheduled Monument by Historic England and was first listed in 1992.

Description 
The entrance to the cave is situated on the side of a large limestone outcrop known as Chudleigh Rocks. The entrance, which is arched, is approximately 4.5 metres high and 5 metres in width.

Excavations 
Cow Cave is known to contain significant deposits of material from the Paleolithic period.

A significant excavation was carried out in 2016.

References

Further reading
 Archaeological Data Service

Scheduled monuments in Devon
Limestone caves
Paleolithic sites
Chudleigh
Caves of Devon